Manning is a small town in, and the county seat of, Dunn County, North Dakota, United States. Manning was founded in 1908 to serve as the seat of Dunn County, itself organized that year.  Its population was not reported in the 2000 census, but was included in the 2020 census, where a population of 47 was given. Its ZIP Code is 58642.

An unincorporated community, Manning, along with the surrounding inhabited vicinity, was designated part of the United States Census Bureau's Participant Statistical Areas Program on March 31, 2010, with the name of the Manning Census Designated Place

Name
Manning was named after the pioneer rancher Dan Manning (1845–1914), who promoted the area. It was originally suggested that the community be named Owensville after William P. Owens (1870–1913) because administrative work was carried out at his home, but Owens declined to have the community named after him.

Climate
This climatic region is typified by large seasonal temperature differences, with warm to hot (and often humid) summers and cold (sometimes severely cold) winters.  According to the Köppen Climate Classification system, Manning has a humid continental climate, abbreviated "Dfb" on climate maps.

Notable People
Mel Ruder, Pulitzer Prize winning journalist was born in Manning.

Education
It is zoned to the Killdeer School District.

References

Census-designated places in Dunn County, North Dakota
Census-designated places in North Dakota
County seats in North Dakota
Unincorporated communities in North Dakota
Unincorporated communities in Dunn County, North Dakota